Sinocyclocheilus brevibarbatus is a species of cyprinid fish in the genus Sinocyclocheilus.

References 

brevibarbatus
Fish described in 2008